Thomas E. O'Shea (April 18, 1895 – September 29, 1918) was a United States Army corporal during World War I. He was killed by Germans while trying to rescue others near Le Catelet, France on September 29, 1918. He posthumously received the Medal of Honor for his heroic actions. O'Shea was a resident of Summit, New Jersey.

O'Shea is buried in the Somme American Cemetery and Memorial in Picardy, northern France.

Medal of Honor Citation
Rank and organization: Corporal, U.S. Army, Machine Gun Company, 107th Infantry, 27th Division.
Place and date: Near Le Catelet, France, 29 September 1918.
Entered service at: Summit, New Jersey.
Birth: New York City, New York.
General Orders No.20. War Department, January 30, 1919.

Citation:
Becoming separated from their platoon by a smoke barrage, Cpl. O'Shea, with 2 other soldiers, took cover in a shell hole well within the enemy's lines. Upon hearing a call for help from an American tank, which had become disabled 30 yards from them, the 3 soldiers left their shelter and started toward the tank under heavy fire from German machineguns and trench mortars. In crossing the fire-swept area Cpl. O'Shea was mortally wounded and died of his wounds shortly afterwards.

Military Awards 
O'Shea's military decorations and awards include:

See also

John Cridland Latham
Alan Louis Eggers
List of Medal of Honor recipients for World War I

References

Sources

1895 births
1918 deaths
United States Army Medal of Honor recipients
American military personnel killed in World War I
People from Summit, New Jersey
United States Army non-commissioned officers
United States Army personnel of World War I
World War I recipients of the Medal of Honor
Recipients of the Distinguished Conduct Medal
Military personnel from New York City
Burials in Hauts-de-France